In mathematics, Arnold's spectral sequence (also spelled Arnol'd) is a spectral sequence used in singularity theory and normal form theory as an efficient computational tool for reducing a function to canonical form near critical points. It was introduced by Vladimir Arnold in 1975.

Definition

References 

Spectral sequences
Singularity theory